Cyphosticha pterocola is a moth of the family Gracillariidae. It is known from Karnataka, India.

References

Gracillariinae
Moths of Asia